Richa Moorjani is an American actress who is best known for her role as Kamala in the series Never Have I Ever.

Early life and family 
Moorjani attended the University of California, Davis, where she majored in communications. She graduated in 2011.

For the past 25 years, Moorjani has been a student of Srimati Anuradha Nag (Tarangini School of Kathak Dance) and has been trained in various styles of western and Indian dance. She told The Hindu, "I will dance until I cannot. Basically, until I die!" 

Moorjani's family managed a Bollywood music band.

Career 
Moorjani's early years as an actor saw her playing guest roles in several television shows includingThe Mindy Project (directed by Mindy Kaling), NCIS: Los Angeles and 9-1-1. She also voice-acted in Fallout 76, a 2018 online action role-playing video game developed by Bethesda Game Studios and published by Bethesda Softworks.

Since 2020, Moorjani has been portraying one of the lead characters in Netflix original series Never Have I Ever, which was also co-written by Kaling. She auditioned for Never Have I Ever through an open casting call. Richa plays main character Devi's cousin, Kamala Nandiawada, in the series. Kamala is a PhD student in biology at Caltech. Speaking on playing a woman of colour in STEM, she tells The Hindu, "I learned about how much women of colour in STEM go through. It’s a real systemic problem where their names are taken off research papers. Granted we see what Kamala goes through in the lab via a comedic lens, but I was keen to show this storyline”.

As of late-2021, Moorjani's next project Broken Drawer, directed by Rippin Sindher, has been in post-production. The film is loosely inspired by true events, following a young Sikh mother who was killed while working at her family-owned convenience store in rural California. "Rippin called me and told me how special this role was to her, being based off her mother, and that she couldn't see anyone playing it but me. It turned out to be such a lovely and fulfilling experience," Moorjani told The Hindu.

Filmography 
 Films

 
 Television 

 Video games
Fallout 76 (2018) as Abigayle Singh, Watoga, Natasha Hunt, and Nari Simir (voice role)
Uncharted: The Lost Legacy as additional voices

References

External links 

Living people
Actresses from the San Francisco Bay Area
Actresses from California
American film actresses
American television actresses
American actresses of Indian descent
University of California, Davis alumni
American expatriate actresses in India
21st-century American women
21st-century American actresses
Year of birth missing (living people)